Paso de los Libres Department is a  department of Corrientes Province in Argentina.

Settlements
Bonpland
Parada Pucheta
Paso de los Libres
Tapebicuá

Departments of Corrientes Province